Sarcopyrenia is a genus of lichenicolous (lichen-dwelling) fungi. It has 11 species. It is the only genus in Sarcopyreniaceae, a family in the order Verrucariales. Sarcopyrenia was circumscribed by Finnish lichenologist William Nylander in 1858, with Sarcopyrenia gibba assigned as the type species. Sarcopyreniaceae is one of the few families composed entirely of lichenicolous fungi.

Species
Host data is from Diederich, Lawrey, and Ertz's 2018 review of lichenicolous fungi.
Sarcopyrenia acutispora  – on Bagliettoa calciseda
Sarcopyrenia bacillosa  – on saxicolous lichens
Sarcopyrenia bacillospora  – on Thelidium and Verrucaria
Sarcopyrenia baetica  – on Lecania  cf. erysibe
Sarcopyrenia beckhausiana  – on saxicolous lichens (mostly from family Verrucariaceae)
Sarcopyrenia calcarea 
Sarcopyrenia cylindrospora  – mostly on Aspicilia
Sarcopyrenia gibba  – on saxicolous lichens
Sarcopyrenia lichinellae  – on Lichinella stipatula
Sarcopyrenia pluriseptata  – on Pyrenodesmia variabilis
Sarcopyrenia sigmoideospora  – on Bagliettoa

References

Eurotiomycetes
Eurotiomycetes genera
Taxa described in 1858
Taxa named by William Nylander (botanist)
Lichenicolous fungi